David Petersen or Dave Petersen may refer to:

 David Petersen (composer) (1650/1–1737), violinist and composer of north German origin active in the Netherlands
 David Petersen (sculptor) (born 1944), Welsh sculptor
 David L. Petersen, American theologian
 David Petersen (comics) (born 1977), American comic book creator
 Dave Petersen (born 1992), English rugby league player
 David Petersen (Arizona politician), Arizona politician

See also

David Peterson (disambiguation)